The Larkins is a British comedy drama television series, produced by Objective Fiction and Genial Productions. The series is the most recent adaptation of H. E. Bates novel The Darling Buds of May.

Both the novel and the series are set in rural 1950s Kent and revolve around the life of Pop and Ma Larkin and their six children. The series stars Bradley Walsh as "Pop" Larkin and Joanna Scanlan as "Ma" Larkin. The eldest daughter of the family, Mariette, is played by Sabrina Bartlett (series 1) and Joelle Rae (series 2), while Tok Stephen plays accountant, Cedric "Charley" Charlton.

In February 2023 the British tabloid press speculated that the series had been axed due to poor ratings, although there was no official statement from ITV. In a television interview however, Bradley Walsh suggested that although there might be no new series in 2023 due to his own unavailability, the possibility of a feature-length special was being explored.

Characters

Episodes

Series overview

Series 1 (2021)

Christmas Special (2021)

Series 2 (2022)

Filming locations 
Various locations throughout the south east of England have been used during filming to stand in for the fictional setting of Littlechurch including the villages of West Peckham and Underriver in Kent. Romshed Farm near Sevenoaks served as the Larkins farm and home. According to the Kent Film office some of the other key locations for series 1 are:

 Viking Bay and Victoria Gardens in Broadstairs
 Faversham (and the Guildhall)
 Stonepitts Farm near Sevenoaks
 Long Barn in Sundridge
 Squerryes Court in Westerham
 The Walpole Bay Hotel & Museum in Margate
 Eynsford (The Village Hall, Castle Hotel, The Five Bells Pub and Eynsford riverside)

New locations featured in the 2021 Christmas Special included Underriver Village Hall, a private residence in Underriver and a private cottage in Chiddingstone.

Reception

Reviews 
The first episode of The Larkins received generally positive reviews.

James Jackson of The Times wrote that "The jollity of the voracious Larkin family is undeniable, bursting with enough warmth to power an entire country village", with the publication awarding it four stars out of five. The Radio Times also awarded the episode four stars out of five, particularly praising Bradley Walsh as Pop, and wrote that "The Larkins isn't necessarily anything revolutionary [...] But what it is is a joyous, comforting and homely show which feels like you're getting a big old hug."

Benjie Goodhart, writing for Saga Magazine, wrote that despite his reservations, he "loved it" and praised the cast as "excellent". The Telegraphs Vicki Power remarked that "the dialogue fizzes with playful wit" and summarized their review by saying, "Shot in lush golden hues, this is an entertaining hour of warm-bath telly, the perfick autumn antidote".

In contrast, The Telegraphs Anita Singh gave the episode two stars out of five, criticizing the acting and the racial diversity of the cast they felt was not representative of the time period and setting. However with some of these shortcomings removed she revised her opinion for episode 1 of series two, awarding it four stars and writing "the show is playing to its strengths: broad comedy and sweet romance. It also serves as a nice hour of escapism".

Sean O'Grady of The Independent described the episode as "an abomination" and "opioid atavistic tosh", panning the portrayal of the setting as "cloyingly class-ridden [...] and bewilderingly archaic to modern eyes".

Viewership 
The opening episode was the third most-watched show of the week and second most-watched show of the day. It averaged just over 5.3 million people (including those watching on British television network ITV's +1 channel) and was watched by 35.3% of the audience over the hour. Following a seven-day catch-up period, the figure aggregated to 6.58 million people.

Broadcast 
Internationally, the series was acquired in New Zealand by the TVNZ network and premiered on 31 October 2021. It began its first series run in Belgium and The Netherlands on 15 November 2021 via the BBC First channel. In Australia the series was picked up by ABC and broadcast in the prime time Saturday evening slot starting on 27 November 2021. First broadcast rights in the US and Canada have been acquired by the AMC-owned Acorn TV streaming service with the first two episodes available to stream on 13 December 2021. In Spain the series was released on 4 January 2022 on Filmin. While the second season was released on 27 December 2022.

Home media

References

External links

The Larkins at HEBates.com

2021 British television series debuts
2022 British television series endings
2020s British comedy-drama television series
ITV comedy-dramas
Period family drama television series
Television series set in the 1950s
Television series about siblings
Television shows based on British novels
Television shows set in Kent
Television shows shot in Kent
Works by H. E. Bates
Television series by All3Media
English-language television shows